Edward Leslie Seager was Archdeacon of Dorset from 1955 to 1974.

Born on 5 October 1904, he was educated at Bromsgrove School and Durham University, becoming ordained in 1929.

Education 
Seager attended Durham University, where he was a member of Hatfield College. 

He was notably involved with the Durham Union Society and the Durham University History Society. He was secretary of the Durham Union during 1926 and President in the Easter Term of 1927. He was also the first president, and thus likely the founder, of the Durham University History Society, his term lasting the easter term of 1926.

Career 
He was Chaplain at Wellington School from 1931 until 1939; and a Chaplain to the Forces from then until 1946. He was Vicar of Gillingham, Dorset from 1946 to 1979, Rural Dean of Shaftesbury from 1951 to 1956; and a Canon of  Salisbury Cathedral from 1954 to 1968.

He died on 2 November 1983.

Notes

1916 births
People educated at Bromsgrove School
Alumni of Hatfield College, Durham
Archdeacons of Dorset
1982 deaths
Presidents of the Durham Union